Justin Michael Bibbs (born January 14, 1996) is an American professional basketball player for Śląsk Wrocław of the PLK. He played college basketball for the Virginia Tech Hokies.

Early life and high school career
Bibbs is the nephew of Pro Football Hall of Fame inductee Mike Haynes. Bibbs helped lead Montverde Academy to two national titles and a 28–0 record in his senior year. He was ranked one of the top shooting guards by several recruiting services.

College career
Bibbs averaged 11.4 points and 3 rebounds per game as a freshman on an 11–22 team. As a sophomore, Bibbs posted 11.7 points per game on a team that finished 20–15 and reached the NIT. In Bibbs's junior season at Virginia Tech, he led the team to a 22–11 record and a berth in the NCAA Tournament for the first time since 2007. He averaged 9.2 points per game, shooting 43 percent from behind the arc. He had a season-high 18 points in three games. As a senior, Bibbs averaged 13.3 points, 2.5 rebounds, and 1.5 assists per game, shooting 40% on three-pointers. He was also one of the best defenders on the team and was often tasked with guarding the opposing team's best player. After the season Bibbs participated in the Portsmouth Invitational Tournament.

Professional career

Maine Red Claws
After going undrafted in the 2018 NBA draft, Bibbs signed with the Boston Celtics for NBA Summer League. He averaged 5.0 points, 1.7 rebounds and 1.0 assist per game in six games. In September 2018 he joined the Celtics for training camp. Bibbs was waived by the Celtics on October 1, 2018. He was signed by the Celtics' G League affiliate, the Maine Red Claws. On January 30, 2019, Bibbs scored 30 points including 16 points in the fourth quarter in a 94–86 win against the Canton Charge.

Agua Caliente Clippers
On March 13, 2019, the Los Angeles Clippers announced that they had signed Bibbs to a 10-day contract. He was later assigned to their G League affiliate the Agua Caliente Clippers.

Maine Red Claws (II)
On November 7, 2019, it was announced that Bibbs would be returning to the Maine Red Claws as a member of their opening day roster. He scored the game-winning bucket against the College Park Skyhawks on January 19, 2020, and finished with 15 points, six rebounds, six assists and four steals.

Auckland Huskies and Śląsk Wrocław
On May 18, 2021, Bibbs signed with the Auckland Huskies for the rest of the 2021 New Zealand NBL season. He missed the Huskies' semi-final with a right hand injury.

Bibbs joined Śląsk Wrocław of the PLK for the 2021–22 season.

International career
On June 19, 2015 Bibbs was announced as a member of the 12-man 2015 USA Basketball Men's U19 World Championship Team for the 2015 FIBA Under-19 World Championship, replacing Isaiah Briscoe who suffered a concussion. The team won the gold medal against Croatia.

Career statistics

NBA G League 

|-
| style="text-align:left;"| 2018–19
| style="text-align:left;"| Maine
| 44 || 30 || 30.0 || .416 || .320 || .785 || 3.0 || 2.6 || .4 || .1 || 11.8
|-
| style="text-align:left;"| 2018–19
| style="text-align:left;"| A.C. Clippers
| 5 || 0 || 25.4 || .485 || .286 || .500 || 4.0 || 1.6 || .8 || 0.0 || 8.2
|- class="sortbottom"
| style="text-align:center;" colspan="2"| Career
| 50 || 9 || 26.0 || .408 || .375 || 2.2 || 6.4 || 1.9 || .9 || .4 || 12.7

References

External links

Virginia Tech Hokies bio
Justin Bibbs G League Stats

1996 births
Living people
American expatriate basketball people in New Zealand
American men's basketball players
Auckland Huskies players
Basketball players from Dayton, Ohio
Maine Red Claws players
Montverde Academy alumni
Shooting guards
Śląsk Wrocław basketball players
Virginia Tech Hokies men's basketball players